Alexander Chibuzo Ibezim is an Anglican bishop in Nigeria.

Ibezim born on 5 August 1962 in Nibo-Nise  and educated at the University of Nigeria. He was ordained  in 1994. he served in Lagos,
rising to be an Archdeacon. In 2010 he became Bishop of Awka; and in 2020 Archbishop of Niger.

Ibezim was consecrated a bishop on 12 September 2010 at St Peter's Cathedral, Asaba and installed there as Bishop of Awka on 22 November 2010; he was later (additionally) elected Archbishop in 2019 and installed on 24 September 2019.

References

Living people
Anglican bishops of Awka
Anglican archbishops of the Niger
21st-century Anglican archbishops
21st-century Anglican bishops in Nigeria
1962 births
People from Anambra State
Church of Nigeria archdeacons